Merci is the eighth studio album by French rock band Magma, released May 4, 1985.

The album largely departs from Magma's other offerings, with a more soul and jazz-funk influence. The lyrical language Kobaïan, created by the band's leader Christian Vander, was joined by English and French.

After this album's release, the band split, and would not release another album for twenty years until 2004's K.A (Köhntarkösz Anteria).

Track listing
All songs written by Christian Vander, except where noted.

Side one
 "Call from the Dark (Ooh Ooh Baby)" - 7:20 (Christian Vander / Julie & Ricky Dassin)
 "Otis" - 5:20
 "Do the Music" - 4:25
 "Otis (Ending)" - 1:32

Side two
 "I Must Return" - 6:32 (Christian Vander / Julie & Ricky Dassin)
 "Eliphas Levi" - 11:15 (René Garber)
 "The Night We Died" - 3:40

Personnel 
 Christian Vander – vocals, piano, celeste, keyboards, percussion
 Stella Vander – vocals
 Guy Khalifa – vocals
 Liza Deluxe – backing vocals
 Benoit Widemann – synthesizer
 Klaus Blasquiz - lead vocal on (1)
 Simon Goubert – synthesizer (1, 3)
 Jean Pierre Fouquey – Rhodes piano on (2)
 Phillipe Slominski – trumpet on (1, 3, 4)
 Christian Martinez – trumpet on (1, 4)
 Michel Goldberg – saxophone on (1, 3)
 Michel Gaucher – saxophone on (2)
 Freddy Opsepian – trumpet on (2)
 Christian Guizen – trombone on (2)
 Alex Ferrand – vocals on (3)
 Jean-Luc Chevalier – guitar on (3)
 Patrick Gauthier – synthesizer on (3)
 Paul Bayle – saxophone on (3)
 Denis LeLoup – trombone on (3, 4)
 Arrigo Lorenz – soprano sax on (3)
 Maria Popkiewicz – backing vocals on (4)
 Jerome Naulay – trombone on (4)
 Zaka – percussion on (4)
 Michel Graillier – Rhodes piano on (5)
 Marc Éliard – bass
 François Laizeau – drums, drum programming

External links 
 Merci at www.progarchives.com
 Merci at www.allmusic.com

Magma (band) albums
1985 albums